Mallu Ravi is an Indian politician. He is the Senior Vice President of Telangana Pradesh Congress Committee. He was a Member of Parliament in 13th Lok Sabha. He was Andhra Pradesh State Government's special representative in Delhi.

Career
Mallu Ravi started his career with the Congress party as a student leader. He was MP for Nagar Kurnool in 1991-1996 and 1998-1999 but lost his seat in 1999. He contested the seat for Jedcherlla in elections in 2008 by-election and won in the by-election. He contested  2009 and 2014 General Elections but he lost both times by more than 20,000 votes. At present he is appointed Sr.Vice President For TPCC.

Personal life
Mallu Ravi is married to the daughter of former congressman and minister Koneru Ranga Rao.

References 

Indian National Congress politicians from Telangana
Politicians from Hyderabad, India
India MPs 1998–1999
Telugu politicians
Telangana politicians
Living people
India MPs 1991–1996
Lok Sabha members from Andhra Pradesh
People from Nagarkurnool district
Year of birth missing (living people)